Herjava is a village in Ridala Parish, Lääne County, in western Estonia.

References
 

Villages in Lääne County